Malaikottai is a 2007 Indian Tamil-language action film written and directed by Boopathy Pandian. The film stars Vishal and Priyamani, while Devaraj, Ajay, Ashish Vidyarthi, and Urvashi play supporting roles. The music was composed by Mani Sharma.

Plot 
Anbu (Vishal) is a happy-go-lucky engineering student who lives with his family in Pattukottai and has fun with his friends. One day, he gets into a fracas with a local politician (Dhandapani) and his comic henchmen while trying to save a friend, and is arrested and has a case registered against him. The local court gives him conditional bail, provided that he signs the register in a Trichy police station. On the way to the police station, he sees a girl on a terrace drying clothes and falls for her. It is love at first sight for Anbu as he becomes crazy about Malar (Priyamani), a college girl, which leads to some hilarious situations. The police station, where he has to sign daily, is manned by his uncle Kandasamy (Ashish Vidyarthi), a comic inspector whose ex-lover Kamala (Urvasi) is the constable at the station. Anbu kindles his uncle's love life and makes merry at Malar’s college, leading to funny situations. Meanwhile, Trichy is run by a powerful politician Palani (Devaraj) and his brother Guna (Ajay), who have killed the local RDO in cold blood, watched by a huge crowd of onlookers. The brothers continue with their 'dadagiri' until they clash with Anbu. The reason is that while trying to save Malar from a situation with Palani, Anbu ends up getting the wrath of the brothers. Although Malar's mother wants to move away from the city, Anbu and his aunt convince her to stay and make Anbu Malar's protector. He accompanies her and protects her from danger. After seeing his care, Malar slowly falls for Anbu and sees his true love for her. Palani causes problems for Anbu, but Anbu overcomes them and gets Palani killed by Kandasamy. Malar graduates and marries Anbu, and the story ends.

Cast 

 Vishal as Anbu
 Priyamani as Malar
 Devaraj as Palani
 Ajay as Guna
 Ashish Vidyarthi as Kandasamy
 Urvashi as Kamala
 Azhagu as Anbu's father
 Dhandapani as Politician
 Mayilsamy as Idimutti Kannan
 Ponnambalam as Kukkala Bhaskar
 Poovilangu Mohan
 Ajay Rathnam as RTO official
 Aarthi as Malar's friend
 Deepa Venkat as RTO's wife
 Rekha as Malar's mother
 Nirosha as Kandasamy's wife
 G. M. Kumar as Pazhani's Righthand man
 Manobala as Bhaskar's aide
 Ashwanth Thilak (special appearance)
 Kanal Kannan as Mattu Sekar (special appearance)

Production 
Shooting for the film commenced on 12 May 2007, at the Kumbakonam Mahamaham tank with picturisation of a song on Vishal.

This was followed by shooting near the Srirangam temple, Tiruchirapalli central bus stand, Kollidam bridge, Thiruvaiyaru court and near the Cauvery bridge in Tiruchirapalli.

Soundtrack 

The music was scored by Mani Sharma. The track "Yeh Aatha" is a remix of the same-titled song scored by Ilaiyaraaja for the 1982 film Payanangal Mudivathillai.

Release 
The satellite rights of the film were sold to Kalaignar.

Critical reception 
The film received mixed reviews. Sify wrote:"big let-down". Behindwoods wrote:"average masala-mix entertainer". Reviewing the film, idlebrain.com rated it 3/5, along with writing "This film is definitely not for the class audiences. But has the potential to do well with the masses." Fullyhyd.com gave it 1.5/5 star rating, along with stating "You can wait for this one's DVD to come out to watch it, but that would be stupid. Instead, just forget it."

Box office 
The film grossed  15 crore. The movie was declared a super hit at the box office.

References

External links 
 

Films set in Tiruchirappalli
Films shot in Tiruchirappalli
2007 films
2000s Tamil-language films
Films scored by Mani Sharma
2000s masala films
Films directed by Boopathy Pandian